The Wii Menu is the graphical shell of the Wii and Wii U game console, as part of the Wii system software. It has four pages, each with a 4:3 grid, and each displaying the current time and date. Available applications, known as "channels", are displayed and can be navigated using the pointer capability of the Wii Remote. The grid is customizable; users can move channels (except for the Disc Channel) among the menu's 48 customizable slots by pressing and holding the B button while hovering over the channel the user wanted to move, then pressing and holding the A button and moving the channel. By pressing the plus and minus buttons on the Wii Remote users can scroll across accessing empty slots.

Pre-installed channels

Disc Channel
The Disc Channel is the primary way to play Wii and GameCube titles from supported Nintendo optical discs inserted into the console.

If no disc is inserted, the message "Please insert a disc." will be displayed along with images of a template Wii and GameCube disc (the latter is not visible on the Wii Family Edition units, the Wii Mini, and the Wii U due to lack of official GameCube support). The "Start" button will also remain deactivated until a playable disc is inserted.

When a disc is inserted, the channel preview and banner on the menu will change to the one supplied by the title and the "Start" button will become available. If it is a GameCube disc, the banner and preview will change to the GameCube logo with the GameCube startup theme playing.

Each Wii game disc includes a system update partition, which includes the latest Wii software from the time the game was released. If a disc that is inserted contains newer software than the one installed on the console, installing the new software will be required to play the game. This allows users without an internet connection to still receive system updates. When loaded into the disc slot, an icon on the Disc Channel that says "Wii System Update" appears. After selecting the channel, the Wii will automatically update. If these updates are not installed, the game will remain unplayable until the update is installed, as each time the channel is loaded with the game inserted, the update prompt will appear, and declining the update will return the player to the Wii Menu instead of starting the game.

Games requiring a system update can still be played without updating using homebrew software, such as Gecko OS or a USB loader.

Mii Channel

The Mii Channel is an avatar creator, where users can design 3D caricatures of people called Miis by selecting from a group of facial and bodily features. At the Game Developers Conference 2007, Shigeru Miyamoto explained that the look and design of the Mii characters are based on Kokeshi, a form of Japanese doll used as souvenir gifts.

A Wired interview of Katsuya Eguchi (producer of Animal Crossing and Wii Sports) held in 2006 confirmed that the custom player avatar feature shown at Nintendo's E3 Media Briefing would be included in the hardware. The feature was described as part of a "profile" system that contains the Mii and other pertinent player information. This application was officially unveiled by Nintendo in September 2006. It is incorporated into Wii's operating system interface as the "Mii Channel". Users can select from pre-made Miis or create their own by choosing custom facial shapes, colors, and positioning. In certain games like Wii Sports, Wii Play, Wii Fit, Wii Music, Wii Sports Resort, Wii Party, Wii Fit Plus, Wii Play: Motion, Mario & Sonic at the Olympic Games, WarioWare: Smooth Moves, Mario Kart Wii, Mario Party 8, My Pokémon Ranch, Animal Crossing: City Folk, Big Brain Academy: Wii Degree, Mario Strikers Charged, and Guitar Hero 5, each player's Mii will serve as the character the player controls in some/all forms of gameplay. Miis can interact with other Wii users by showing up on their Wii consoles through the WiiConnect24 feature or by talking with other Miis created by Wii owners all over the world. This feature is called Mii Parade. Early-created Miis as well as those encountered in Mii Parades may show up as spectators in some games. Miis can be stored on Wii Remotes and taken to other Wii consoles. The Wii Remote can hold a maximum of 10 Miis.

In addition, Mii characters can be transferred from a user's Wii to Nintendo 3DS consoles, as well as supported Nintendo DS games via the Mii Channel. While in the channel, pressing A, followed by B, then 1, and holding 2 on the Wii Remote allows the user to unlock the feature. The Mii Channel is succeeded by the Mii Maker app for both Nintendo 3DS and Wii U, and the Mii options in Settings for Nintendo Switch.

According to Nintendo president Satoru Iwata, over 160 million Mii characters had been created using the Mii Channel as of May 2010.

Photo Channel
If a user inserts an SD card into the console, or receives photos (JPEG) or videos (MJPEG) via email, they can be viewed using the Photo Channel. The user can create a slideshow simply by inserting an SD card with photos and, optionally, MP3 or AAC files (see note regarding December 10, 2007 update to version 1.1).  The Wii will automatically add Ken Burns Effect transitions between the photos and play either the music on the SD card or built-in music in the background. A built-in editor allows users to add markings and effects to their photos or videos (The edits float statically above the videos). Mosaics can also be created with this feature. Puzzles can be created from photos or videos with varying degrees of difficulty (However, your first puzzle will be six-pieces) with 6, 12, 24 and 48 piece puzzles available, with 192 selectable while holding down 1 on the Wii Remote. Edited photos can be saved to the Wii and sent to other Wiis via the message board. According to the system's manual, the following file extensions (i.e. formats) are supported: Photos (jpeg/jpg), Movies (mov/avi), and Music (mp3/aac).

JPEG files can be up to 8192x8192 resolution and in baseline format. Video data contained within the .mov or .avi files must be in an OpenDML-compliant MotionJPEG and use some variant of this format for their videos, with a resolution of up to 848×480 pixels (Wide VGA). Photos, even high resolution ones, are compressed and decreased in resolution.

Photo Channel 1.1
Photo Channel 1.1 is an optional update to the Photo Channel that became available on the Wii Shop Channel on December 10, 2007. It allows users to customize the Photo Channel icon on the Wii Menu with photos from an SD Card or the Wii Message Board. It also allows playback of songs in random order. The update replaced MP3 support with support for MPEG-4 encoded audio files encoded with AAC in the .m4a extension.

Wii owners who updated to version 1.1 can revert to version 1.0 by deleting it from the channels menu in the data management setup. Consoles released after December 10, 2007 come with the version 1.1 update pre-installed, and cannot be downgraded to version 1.0.

Owners of Japanese systems can download a "Revert to Photo Channel 1.0" Channel from the Wii Shop Channel if they wish to do so.

Wii Shop Channel

The Wii Shop Channel allowed users to download games and other software by redeeming Wii Points, which could be obtained by purchasing Nintendo Points cards from retail outlets or directly through the Wii Shop Channel using MasterCard or Visa credit cards online. Users could browse in the Virtual Console, WiiWare, or Wii Channels sections for downloads. A feature to purchase downloaded software as gifts for others became available worldwide on December 10, 2007. Additional channels that were not released at the console's launch were available for purchase in the Wii Shop Channel. These included: Internet Channel, Everybody Votes Channel, Check Mii Out Channel, Nintendo Channel, Netflix Channel, and the Japan-only Television Friend Channel. Until the channel's shut down on January 30, 2019, all downloadable channels were free of charge. The name was originally going to be called the Shopping Channel.

Nintendo discontinued the Wii Shop Channel on January 30, 2019 (having announced that they planned to do so on September 29, 2017), with the purchase of Wii Points ending on March 26, 2018. The ability to redownload previously purchased content and/or transfer Wii data from the Wii to the Wii U still remains available.

Forecast Channel
The Forecast Channel allowed weather reports and forecasts to be shown on the console from the Internet via the WiiConnect24 service. The Forecast Channel displayed a view of the Earth as a globe (courtesy of NASA), with which users can view weather in other regions. The user could also spin the globe. When fully zoomed out, an accurate star map was visible in the background. (The Big Dipper and the constellation Orion were easily recognizable, for example.) The Forecast Channel features included the current forecast, the UV index, today's overall forecast, tomorrow's forecast, a 5-day forecast (only for the selected country in which the user lives), a laundry check (Japan Only) and pollen count (Japan only). The Forecast Channel first became available on December 19, 2006. Certain games like Madden NFL 07, Nights: Journey of Dreams, and Mario & Sonic at the Olympic Winter Games could use the Forecast Channel to simulate weather conditions depending on the player's region.

There are slight variations of Forecast Channel versions in different regions. When viewing weather conditions in Japan, a different set of weather icons is used. Additionally, the laundry index was only featured in the Japanese version.

After the August 6, 2007 update, the Forecast Channel showed the icon for the current weather on the Wii Menu.
Long neglect of this channel would result in the icon not appearing, although the set time was longer than that of the News Channel.

The Forecast Channel (along with the News Channel) was not available in South Korea.

Like the four other Wii channels (News Channel, Everybody Votes Channel, Check Mii Out Channel/Mii Contest Channel, Nintendo Channel), the Forecast Channel ended its seven-year support on June 27, 2013.

News Channel
The News Channel allowed users to access news headlines and current news events obtained from the Internet. News articles were available on a globe view, allowing users to view news from certain areas of the world (similar to the Forecast Channel), and as a slide show. The content was automatically updated and viewable via WiiConnect24 with clickable news images supported. The channel contained seven categories: National News, International News, Sports, Arts/Entertainment, Business, Technology and Oddities.

The News Channel became available in North America, Europe, and Australia on January 26, 2007. Content was in a variety of languages provided by the Associated Press, who had a two-year contract to provide news and photos to Nintendo. Canadian news was submitted by the Canadian Press for publication. Japanese news was provided by Goo. European news was provided by Agence France-Presse.

Starting with the August 6, 2007 update, the News Channel showed a news ticker in the Wii Menu, and when selecting the channel. However, not visiting the channel for a period of time resulted in the ticker not appearing, instead displaying "You must use the News Channel regularly for news to be displayed on this screen." on the preview screen until the channel was opened up. A December 20, 2007 PAL region update increased the number of news feeds to the channel, sourced from a larger number of news resources and agencies, providing more news that were available per country.

The News Channel (along with the Forecast Channel) was not available in South Korea.

Like the four other Wii channels (Forecast Channel, Everybody Votes Channel, Mii Contest Channel, Nintendo Channel), the News Channel ended its seven-year support on June 27, 2013.

Get Connected Video Channel
The Get Connected Video Channel or Wii & the Internet Channel (or alternatively known as the Wii + Internet Channel or Wii: See What You Can Do On the Internet) is pre-installed onto Wii console units manufactured in October 2008 or later. It contains an informational video specifying the benefits of connecting the Wii console to the Internet, such as downloading extra channels, new software, Virtual Console titles, and playing games over Nintendo Wi-Fi Connection.

The Get Connected Video Channel is the only pre-installed channel that takes up spare internal memory, and the only channel that can be manually deleted or moved to an SD Card by the user. The channel takes up 1,180 blocks of memory, which is over half the Wii's internal memory space. The large size of this channel is likely due to the fact it is available in multiple languages; three videos in the U.S. versions, and six videos in the PAL versions. Upon connecting to the Internet and running the channel, the user will be asked if they would like to delete it. It cannot be re-downloaded or restored upon deletion.

The same video presentation contained in the channel can also be viewed on an archived version of Nintendo's official website. Furthermore, several gaming stores such as GameStop had this channel in their Wii stations.

The channel is also available in multiple languages. Unlike the other channels, the video in the channel is not translated digitally, but is presented in multiple dubs, which means there are multiple copies of the same video in a single channel. The language of the video is presented is respectively according to the Wii's language setting. Available languages are English, French, and Spanish in the U.S. versions; and English, French, Spanish, German, Italian, and Dutch in the PAL version. The availability of multiple dubs is a likely factor that contributes to the large size of the channel.

Internet Channel
The Internet Channel is a version of the Opera web browser for use on the Wii by Opera Software and Nintendo. On December 22, 2006 a free demo version (promoted as "Internet Channel: Trial Version") of the browser was released. The final version (promoted as "Internet Channel: Final Version") of the browser was released on April 11, 2007 and was free to download until June 30, 2007. After this deadline had passed, the Internet Channel cost 500 Wii Points to download until September 1, 2009, though users who downloaded the browser before June 30, 2007, could continue to use it at no cost for the lifetime of the Wii system. An update (promoted as the "Internet Channel") on October 10, 2007 added USB keyboard compatibility. On September 1, 2009 the Internet Channel was made available to Wii owners for no cost of Wii Points and updated to include improved Adobe Flash Player support. A refund was issued to those who paid for the channel in the form of one free NES game download worth 500 Wii Points.

The Internet Channel uses whichever connection is chosen in the Wii settings, and utilizes the user's internet connection directly; there is no third party network that traffic is being routed through. It receives a connection from a router/modem and uses a web browser to pull up HTTP and HTTPS (secure and encrypted) web pages. Opera, the Wii's web browser, is capable of rendering most web sites in the same manner as its desktop counterpart by using Opera's Medium Screen Rendering technology. For most Internet users, the Wii offers all of the functionality they need to perform the most common Internet tasks.

The software is saved to the Wii's 512 MB internal flash memory (it can be copied to an SD card after it has been downloaded). The temporary Internet files (maximum of 5MB for the trial version) can only be saved to the Wii's internal memory. The application launches within a few seconds, after connecting to the Internet through a wireless LAN using the built-in interface or a wired LAN by using the USB to the Ethernet adapter.

The Opera-based Wii browser allows users full access to the Internet and supports all the same web standards that are included in the desktop versions of Opera, including CSS and JavaScript. It is also possible for the browser to use technologies such as Ajax, SVG, RSS, and Adobe Flash Player 8 and limited support for Adobe Flash Player 9. Opera Software has indicated that the functionality will allow for third parties to create web applications specifically designed for the use on the Wii Browser, and it will support widgets, standalone web-based applications using Opera as an application platform.

Third party APIs and SDKs have been released that allow developers to read the values of the Wii Remote buttons in both Flash and JavaScript. This allows for software that previously required keyboard controls to be converted for use with the Wii Remote. The browser was also used to stream BBC iPlayer videos from April 9, 2008 after an exclusive deal was made with Nintendo UK and the BBC to offer their catch-up service for the Wii. However, the September 2009 update caused the iPlayer to no longer operate. The BBC acknowledged the issue and created a dedicated channel instead. In June 2009, YouTube released YouTube XL, a TV-friendly version of the popular video-sharing website. The regular YouTube page would redirect the browser to YouTube XL, if the website detects that the Internet Channel or the PlayStation 3 browser is being used.

Everybody Votes Channel

Everybody Votes Channel allowed users to vote in simple opinion polls and compare and contrast opinions with those of friends, family, and people across the globe.

Everybody Votes Channel was launched on February 13, 2007, and was available in the Wii Channels section of the Wii Shop Channel. The application allowed Wii owners to vote on various questions using their Mii as a registered voter. Additionally, voters were also able to make predictions for the choice that will be the most popular overall after their own vote has been cast. Each Mii's voting and prediction record is tracked and voters can also view how their opinions compare to others. Whether the Mii is correct in its predictions or not is displayed on a statistics page along with a counter of how many times that Mii has voted. Up to six Miis would be registered to vote on the console. The channel was free to download. Each player would make a suggestion for a poll a day.

Like the other four Wii channels (Forecast Channel, News Channel, Nintendo Channel, Check Mii Out Channel/Mii Contest Channel), the Everybody Votes Channel ended its seven-year support on June 27, 2013 due to Nintendo shifting its resources to its next generation projects. Unlike the other discontinued channels, Everybody Votes Channel remains accessible with users able to view the latest poll data posted, albeit the channel will never be updated again.

Check Mii Out Channel

The Check Mii Out Channel (also known as the Mii Contest Channel in Australia, Europe and Japan and Canal Miirame in Spanish-speaking countries in Latin America) was a channel that allowed players to share their Miis and enter them into popularity contests. It was first available on November 11, 2007. It was available free to download from the Wii Channels section of the Wii Shop Channel.

Users would post their own Miis in the Posting Plaza, or import other user-submitted Miis to their own personal Mii Parade. Each submitted Mii was assigned a 12-digit entry number to aid in searching. Submitted Miis were given 2 initials by their creator and a notable skill/talent to aid in sorting.

In the Contests section, players submitted their own Miis to compete in contests to best fit a certain description (e.g. Mario without his cap). After the time period for sending a Mii had expired, the user had the choice of voting for three Miis featured on the judging panel, with ten random Miis being shown at a time. Once the judging period is over, the results of the contest may be viewed. Their selection and/or submission's popularity in comparison to others was displayed, as well as the winning Mii and user.

The Check Mii Out Channel sent messages to the Wii Message Board concerning recent contests. Participants in certain contests would add their user and submitted Mii to a photo with a background related to the contest theme. This picture would then be sent to the Wii Message Board.

This channel ended its seven-year support on June 27, 2013 like the four other channels (Forecast Channel, News Channel, Everybody Votes Channel, Nintendo Channel).

Nintendo Channel
The Nintendo Channel (known as the Everybody's Nintendo Channel in Japan) allowed Wii users to watch videos such as interviews, trailers, commercials, and even download demos for the Nintendo DS line of systems. The Nintendo Channel has the ability to support Nintendo Entertainment System games, Super NES games, Nintendo 64 games, and GameCube games. Later the channel was used for the Wii U, and the Nintendo Switch under the name of the Nintendo eShop. In this capacity the channel worked in a similar way to the DS Download Station. The channel provided games, info, pages and users could rate games that they have played. A search feature was also available to assist users in finding new games to try or buy. The channel had the ability to take the user directly into the Wii Shop Channel for buying the wanted game immediately. The Nintendo Channel was launched in Japan on November 27, 2007, in North America on May 7, 2008, and in Europe and Australia on May 30, 2008. The Nintendo Channel was updated with different Nintendo DS demos and new videos every week; the actual day of the week varies across different international regions. Nintendo DS demos can be transmitted to the handheld console.

An updated version of the Nintendo Channel was released in Japan on July 15, 2009, North America on September 14, 2009, and in Europe on December 15, 2009. The update introduced a new interface and additional features, options, and statistics for users to view. However, the European version was missing some of these new additional features, such as options for choosing video quality. In addition, a weekly show known as Nintendo Week began airing exclusively on the North American edition of the channel, while another show, Nintendo TV, was available on the UK version of the channel.

The Nintendo Channel and the other 4 channels (Forecast Channel, News Channel, Everybody Votes Channel, and Check Mii Out Channel/Mii Contest Channel) ended their seven-year support on June 27, 2013.

A few shows appeared on Nintendo Channel which were no more than 20 minutes long:

Nintendo Week: The hosts were Gary and Allison, but other co-hosts appeared as well like Dark Gary, Daniel, and others.
Ultimate Wii Challenge/New Super Mario Bros. Wii Challenge: The hosts were David and Ben. They tried to beat each other's time in Nintendo Games like New Super Mario Bros. Wii, Donkey Kong Country Returns, Super Mario Galaxy 2, and Kirby's Epic Yarn. In a few episodes, Ben and David worked together in levels of a few games.

Many Nintendo DS demos were available in Nintendo Channels DS Download Service:

Fossil Fighters: Champions
Kirby Mass Attack
Ōkamiden
Ghost Trick: Phantom Detective
Sonic Colors
Crafting Mama
Pokémon Ranger: Guardian Signs
Ivy the Kiwi?
Dragon Ball: Origins 2
Picross 3D
America's Test Kitchen Pots de Creme
America's Test Kitchen Roasted Red Potatoes
Rooms DS
Battle of Giants: Dragons
Battle of Giants: Mutant Insects
Ace Attorney INVESTIGATIONS: Miles Edgeworth
James Patterson Woman's Murder Club: Games of Passion
Fossil Fighters Gift Fossil (Neutral)
Fossil Fighters Gift Fossil (Water)
Fossil Fighters Gift Fossil (Fire)
Fossil Fighters Gift Fossil (Earth)
Fossil Fighters Cleaning
Mega Man Star Force 3 (until 9/20/2009)
Ice Age: Dawn of the Dinosaurs (until 9/20/2009)
Rhythm Heaven
Personal Trainer: Math
Personal Trainer: Cooking Mac & Cheese (until 12/21/2008)
Personal Trainer: Cooking Lasagna (until 3/22/2009)
Mystery Case Files: MillionHeir
Crosswords DS-Crosswords
Crosswords DS-Wordsearch
Crosswords DS-Anagrams (until 7/27/2008)
Brain Age
Brain Age 2
Flash Focus
Jam Sessions
Rayman Raving Rabbids 2
Cooking Mama 2: Dinner with Friends
Disney Friends
Ninja Gaiden: Dragon Sword
Elebits: The Adventures of Kai and Zero(until 12/21/2008)
Soul Bubbles (until 12/21/2008)
PICTOIMAGE (until 1/18/2009)
Carnival Games (until 7/6/2008)
The Incredible Hulk
Kung Fu Panda
Walt Disney Pictures Bolt (until 1/18/2009)
Imagine Ice Champions
Avalon Code
MLB 2K9 Fantasy All-Stars
Big Bang Mini
Madagascar: Escape 2 Africa
Spectrobes: Beyond the Portals
Ninjatown
Miami Law
Up
Naruto Shippuden: Ninja Council 4
Knights in the Nightmare Tutorial
MySims Kingdom
Battle of Giants: Dinosaurs
Brain Quest Grades 3 & 4
Brain Quest Grades 5 & 6
Spore Creatures
Lock's Quest
My Word Coach

Disconnection
It was announced on April 12, 2013 that the Forecast Channel, the News Channel, the Everybody Votes Channel, the Check Mii Out Channel/Mii Contest Channel, and the Nintendo Channel would be shut down permanently on June 27, 2013, as Nintendo terminated the WiiConnect24 service which these channels required, and shifted their resources to their next-generation projects, such as the Wii U and Nintendo 3DS.

Other channels
These channels were those that could be acquired through the usage of various games and accessories.

Wii Fit/Wii Fit Plus Channel
Wii Fit allowed users to install the Wii Fit Channel to the Wii Menu. The channel allowed them to view and compare their results, and those of others, as well as their progress in the game, without requiring the game disc to be inserted.

The channel was essentially a stripped down version of Wii Fit. It allowed users to view statistics from the game including users' BMI measurements and balance test scores in the form of a line graph, as well as keep track of the various activities they have undertaken with a calendar. Users were also able to weigh themselves and do a BMI and balance test with the channel once per day. However, if the player wishes to do any exercises or play any of the aerobics games and/or balance games, the game prompted the user to insert the Wii Fit game disc.

Mario Kart Channel

Mario Kart Wii allows players to install the Mario Kart Channel on their Wii console. The channel can work without inserting the Mario Kart Wii disc into the console, but to compete in races and time trials the disc is required. The use of the Mario Kart Channel allows for a number of options. A ranking option lets players see their best Time Trial scores for each track and compare their results to those of their friends and other players worldwide, represented by their Miis. Players will have the option of racing against the random or selective ghosts, or improving their results gradually by taking on the ghosts of rivals, those with similar race times. Users have the option to submit these times for others around the world to view. Players can also manage and register friends using the channel and see if any of them are currently online.

Another feature of the channel are Tournaments, where Nintendo invited players to challenges similar to the missions on Mario Kart DS. Players were also able to compare their competition rankings with other players.

As of May 20, 2014, most features of the channel have been discontinued, such as Tournaments.

Jam with the Band Live Channel  (Japan and PAL regions only)
The Nintendo DS game Jam with the Band supports the Jam with the Band Live Channel (known as the Speaker Channel in Japan) that allows players to connect their game to a Wii console and let the game's audio be played through the channel. The channel supports multiple players.

Wii Speak Channel

Users with the Wii Speak peripheral are able to access the Wii Speak Channel. Users can join one of four rooms (with no limit to the number of people in each room) to chat with others online. Each user is represented by their own Mii, which lip-syncs to their words. In addition, users can also leave audio messages for other users by sending a message to their Wii Message Board. Users can also photo slideshows and comment on them. The Wii Speak Channel became available in North America and Europe on December 5, 2008, and was discontinued on May 20, 2014. The Wii Speak Channel is succeeded by Wii U Chat, which is standardized for the Wii U console.

Rabbids Channel
This is a channel created by Rabbids Go Home. When the game is started up for the first time or when the player goes to the player profile screen, the player may install the Rabbids Channel, which will appear on the Wii Menu once it is downloaded. Players can use the channel to view other people's Rabbids and enter contests.

Downloadable channels
Downloadable Channels are Channels that can be bought from the Wii Shop Channel.

Virtual Console Channels

Virtual Console channels were channels that allowed users to play their downloaded Virtual Console games obtained from the Wii Shop Channel. The Virtual Console portion of the Wii Shop Channel specialized in older software originally designed and released for home entertainment platforms that are now defunct. These games were played on the Wii through the emulation of the older hardware. The prices were generally the same in almost every region and were determined primarily by the software's original platform. There was initially planned to be a Virtual Console channel where users could launch their Virtual Console games sorted by console, but this idea was dropped.

WiiWare Channels

Functioning similarly to the Virtual Console channels, WiiWare channels allowed users to use their WiiWar  games obtained from the Wii Shop Channel. The WiiWare section specialized in downloadable software specifically designed for the Wii. The first WiiWare games were made available on March 25, 2008 in Japan. WiiWare games launched in North America on May 12, 2008, and launched in Europe and Australia on May 20, 2008.nintendo.com.au – News from Nintendo 

The WiiWare section was being touted as a forum to provide developers with small budgets to release smaller-scale games without the investment and risk of creating a title to be sold at retail (somewhat similar to the Xbox Live Arcade and the PlayStation Store). While actual games have been planned to appear in this section since its inception, there had been no official word on when any would be appearing until June 27, 2007, when Nintendo made an official confirmation in a press release which revealed the first titles would surface sometime in 2008. According to Nintendo, "The remarkable motion controls will give birth to fresh takes on established genres, as well as original ideas that currently exist only in developers' minds."

Like Virtual Console games, WiiWare games were purchased using Wii Points. Nintendo handled all pricing options for the downloadable games.

Television Friend Channel (Japan only)

The Television Friend Channel allowed Wii users to check what programs are on the television. Content was provided by Guide Plus. It was developed by HAL Laboratory. The channel had been said to be "very fun and Nintendo-esque". A "stamp" feature allowed users to mark programs of interest with a Mii-themed stamp. If an e-mail address or mobile phone number would have been registered in the address book, the channel could send out an alert 30 minutes prior to the start of the selected program. The channel tracked the stamps of all Wii users and allowed users to rate programs on a five-star scale. Additionally, when the channel was active the Wii Remote could be used to change the TV's volume and channel so that users can tune into their shows by way of the channel. The Television Friend Channel launched in Japan on March 4, 2008, and was discontinued on July 24, 2011 due to the shutdown of analog television broadcasts in Japan. It was never launched outside Japan, as most countries, unlike Japan, have a guide built into set-top boxes and/or TVs. The Television Friend Channel was succeeded by the now-defunct Nintendo TVii, which was standardized for the Wii U console. It also had the Kirby 1-UP sound, since it was made by HAL Laboratory. This was later removed before the release of the channel.

Digicam Print Channel (Japan only)
The Digicam Print Channel was a channel developed in collaboration with Fujifilm that allowed users to import their digital photos from an SD card and place them into templates for printable photo books and business cards through a software wizard. The user was also able to place their Mii on a business card. The completed design would then be sent online to Fujifilm who printed and delivered the completed product to the user. The processing of individual photos was also available.

The Digicam Print Channel became available from July 23, 2008 in Japan, and ceased operation on June 26, 2013.

Today and Tomorrow Channel
The Today and Tomorrow Channel became available in Japan on December 2, 2008, and in Europe, Australia, and South Korea on September 9, 2009. The channel was developed in collaboration with Media Kobo and allows users to view fortunes for up to six Miis across five categories: love, work, study, communications, and money. The channel also features a compatibility test that compares two Miis, and also gives out "lucky words" that must be interpreted by the user. The channel uses Mii birthdate data, but users must input a birth year when they are loaded onto the channel. This channel was never released in North America, and although it was discontinued on January 30, 2019 with the Wii Shop Channel discontinuation, it can still be redownloaded if obtained before the Wii Shop Channel'''s closure.

Wii no Ma (Japan only)

A video on-demand service channel was released in Japan on May 1, 2009. The channel was a joint venture between Nintendo and Japanese advertising agency Dentsu. The channel's interface was built around a virtual living room, where up to 8 Miis can be registered and interact with each other. The virtual living room contained a TV which took the viewer to the video list. Celebrity "concierge" Miis occasionally introduced special programming. Nintendo ceased operations of Wii no Ma on April 30, 2012.

Demae Channel (Japan only)
A food delivery service channel was released in Japan on May 26, 2009. The channel was a joint venture between Nintendo and the Japanese on-line food delivery portal service Demae-can, and was developed by Denyu-sha. The channel offered a wide range of foods provided by different food delivery companies which can be ordered directly through the Wii channel. A note was posted to the Wii Message Board containing what had been ordered and the total price. The food was then delivered to the address the Wii user has registered on the channel. On February 22, 2017, Demae Channel was delisted from the Wii Shop Channel, it was later discontinued alongside the Wii U version on March 31, 2017.

BBC iPlayer Channel (UK only)
Wii access to the BBC iPlayer was interrupted on April 9, 2008, when an update to the Opera Browser turned out to be incompatible with the BBC iPlayer. The BBC chose not to make the BBC iPlayer compatible with the upgrade. This was resolved on November 18, 2009 when they released the BBC iPlayer Channel, allowing easier access to the BBC iPlayer.

The BBC had since offered a free, dedicated Wii channel version of their BBC iPlayer application which was only available in the UK. By February 10, 2015, however, the channel was retired and consequently removed from Wii Shop Channel since newer versions are not compatible, and as per BBC's policy to retire older versions as a resource management. The channel had since been succeeded by the BBC iPlayer app on the UK edition of the Wii U eShop, which was released in May 2015.

Netflix Channel

The Netflix channel was released in the United States and Canada on October 18, 2010 and in the UK and Ireland on January 9, 2012. This channel allowed Netflix subscribers to use that service's "Watch Instantly" movie streaming service over the Wii with their regular Netflix subscription fee, and replaced the previous Wii "streaming disc" mailed to Netflix customers with Wii consoles from March 27 to October 17, 2010 due to contractual limitations involving Xbox 360 exclusivity. The channel was free to download in the Wii Channels section of the Wii Shop Channel. The channel displayed roughly 12 unique categories of videos with exactly 75 video titles in each category. The TV category had many seasons of videos (i.e. 15–100 episodes) associated with each title. There were also categories for videos just watched, new releases, and videos recommended (based on the user's Netflix subscription history). On July 31, 2018, the channel was delisted from the Wii Shop Channel; Netflix would drop support for the Wii on January 30, 2019.

LoveFilm Channel (UK and Germany only)
On 4 December 2012, the LoveFilm channel was available to download on Wii consoles in the UK and Germany; the channel was discontinued on 31 October 2017, along with the closure of LoveFilm itself.

Kirby TV Channel (PAL regions only)
The Kirby TV Channel launched on June 23, 2011 in Europe, Australia and New Zealand, and has since been discontinued. The channel allowed users to view episodes of the animated series Kirby: Right Back at Ya! for free. This channel was succeeded by the Nintendo Anime Channel, a Nintendo 3DS video-on-demand app, available in Japan and Europe, which streamed curated anime or anime-inspired shows, such as Kirby: Right Back at Ya!Hulu Plus Channel (USA only)Hulu Plus Channel was a channel for Wii, also as announced in Nintendo Updates on Nintendo Channel. Hulu Plus Channel included classic shows and other Hulu included shows. The channel launched in 2012, and was only available in the United States. On January 30, 2019, Hulu dropped support for the Wii.

The Legend of Zelda: Skyward Sword Save Data Update ChannelThe Legend of Zelda: Skyward Sword Save Data Update Channel fixed an issue in the game The Legend of Zelda: Skyward Sword. This title was the only Wii game to ever receive a downloadable, self-patching service, wherein previous titles with technical issues, such as Metroid: Other M, required the game's owners experiencing said issues to send their Wii consoles to customer service where Nintendo had to manually fix such issues.

YouTube Channel
The YouTube channel allowed the user to view YouTube videos on the television screen and had the ability to sign into an existing YouTube account. The YouTube channel, which became available without warning, was only available in the North American, UK, Japanese, and Australian versions of the Wii system, with the North American release on November 15, 2012, only three days before the Wii U was released in North America. Google planned to gradually make the channel available on Wii in other countries besides the aforementioned regions. The YouTube channel was initially categorized on the Wii Shop Channel as a WiiWare title by mistake, but this was later fixed when the Wii U Transfer Tool channel became available. On June 26, 2017, YouTube terminated legacy support for all devices that continue using the Flash-based YouTube app (typically found in most TV devices released before 2012), which includes the Wii.

Wii U Transfer Tool Channel
This application became available on the Wii Shop Channel the day the Wii U was released per respective region. The only purpose of this channel is to assist transferring all eligible content out from a Wii console to a Wii U console, where the said content would be available via Wii Mode on the target Wii U. The application can transfer all available listed WiiWare titles (initially with the sole exemption of LostWinds for unknown reasons, but the game had since become available for both transfer to and purchase on Wii U since May 2014), all available listed Virtual Console titles, game save data, DLC data, Mii Channel data, Wii Shop Channel data (including Wii Points, conditional that accumulated total does not exceed 10,000 Wii Points on target Wii U), and Nintendo Wi-Fi Connection ID data to a target Wii U (albeit now moot since the service was discontinued in May 2014), but it cannot transfer Wii settings data, pre-installed WiiWare/Virtual Console titles (such as Donkey Kong: Original Edition that came pre-installed in the PAL version of the Super Mario Bros. 25th Anniversary Wii bundle), any game or application software that had been since delisted from the Wii Shop Channel prior to the release of Wii U (such as the Donkey Kong Country trilogy), software that is already available on the target Wii U's Wii Mode, WiiConnect24-supported software and save data (which includes the 16-digit Wii console Friend Code), and Nintendo GameCube save data since the Wii U does not support the latter two. It is possible to move content from multiple Wii consoles to a single target Wii U console, as well as multiple transfers from a single Wii console if required, albeit the last Wii console's content will overwrite any similar Wii data transferred to target Wii U earlier. Due to technical limitations, the channel cannot directly transfer any eligible background data which has been saved on the console's SD card.

The Wii U Transfer Tool Channel features an animation based on the Pikmin series, wherein a visual transfer display of various Pikmin drones would automatically carry the eligible data and software to a Hocotate-based space ship bound for the Wii U. While context dynamic, this animation is not interactive, and only exists for entertainment purposes.
 
The ability to transfer content from the Wii to the Wii U is still available for the foreseeable future after the Wii Shop Channels shutdown on January 30, 2019.

Amazon Instant Video (USA only)
Amazon Instant Video, a video on demand service provided by Amazon, was released as a downloadable Wii channel in the United States on January 17, 2013; the service was discontinued on January 30, 2019.

Crunchyroll
In late 2014, Crunchyroll released their video app for the Wii's successor, Wii U, in North America. However, believing there are still many actively connected Wii consoles in its twilight years, Crunchyroll had surprised users with a Crunchyroll channel for Wii as well, launching the app categorized under WiiWare on October 15, 2015 in North America and the PAL regions. The Crunchyroll Wii channel only permitted access to Premium account holders to the majority of the prime content. On May 5, 2017, less than 20 months after its launch, Crunchyroll ceased support for the Wii due to technical limitations after the service updated with new technology.

Wii Message Board
The Message Board allows users to leave messages for friends, family members, or other users on a calendar-based message board. Users could also use WiiConnect24 to trade messages and pictures with other Wii owners, conventional email accounts (email pictures to console, but not pictures to email), and mobile phones (through text messages). Each Wii has an individual wii.com email account containing the Wii Number. Prior to trading messages it is necessary to add and approve contacts in the address book, although the person added will not get an automatic notification of the request, and must be notified by other means. The service also alerts all users of incoming game-related information.

Message Board was available for users to post messages that are available to other Wii users by usage of Wii Numbers with WiiConnect24.  In addition to writing text, players can also include images from an SD card in the body of messages, as well as attaching a Mii to the message. Announcements of software updates and video game news are posted by Nintendo. The Message Board can be used for posting memos for oneself or for family members without going online. These messages could then be put on any day of the calendar. The Wii Message Board could also be updated automatically by a real-time game like Animal Crossing.Wii Sports, Wii Play, Mario Kart Wii, Wii Speak Channel, Wii Sports Resort, Super Mario Galaxy & Super Mario Galaxy 2  use the Message Board to update the player on any new high scores or gameplay advancements, such as medal placements in the former two titles, completions of races including a photo, audio messages, and letters from the Mailtoad via the Wii Message Board. Metroid Prime 3: Corruption, Super Mario Galaxy, Super Smash Bros Brawl, Elebits, Animal Crossing: City Folk, Dewy's Adventure and the Virtual Console game Pokémon Snap'' allow players to take screenshots and post them to the Message Board to edit later or send to friends via messages. Except for Nintendo GameCube games, the Message Board also records the play history in the form of "Today's Accomplishments". This feature automatically records details of what games or applications were played and for how long. It cannot be deleted or hidden without formatting the console itself. Prior to its closure, the Nintendo Channel was able to automatically tally all Wii game play data from the Message Board and display them in an ordered list within the channel.

Subsequent system updates added a number of minor features to the Message Board, including minor aesthetic changes, USB keyboard support and the ability to receive Internet links from friends, which can be launched in the Internet Channel.

An exploit in the Wii Message Board can be used to homebrew a Wii via a tool called LetterBomb.

Discontinuation
The WiiConnect24 service has been terminated as of June 27, 2013, completely ceasing the data exchange functionality of the Wii Message Board for all Wii consoles, whether as messages or game data. However, Nintendo is still able to continue sending some notification messages after that date to any continuously connected Wii consoles.

SD Card Menu
The SD Card Menu is a feature made available with the release of Wii Menu version 4.0. This menu allows the user to run Virtual Console games, WiiWare games, and Wii Channels directly from the SD card, which makes it possible to free up the Wii's internal memory.  Applications can be downloaded to the SD card directly from the Wii Shop Channel as well.

When running an application from the SD Card Menu, it is temporarily copied to the internal memory of the Wii, meaning the internal memory still must contain an amount of free blocks equal to the application's size.  If the internal memory does not have enough space, the Channel will run an "Automanager" program, which clears up space for the user in one of many ways (selectable by the user).

The manager can place the largest channels on the user's Wii in the SD card, put smaller channels on the SD card until enough space remains to run the channel, clear channels from the left side of the Wii menu to the right side, or from the right side to the left until there are enough blocks to run the channel.

System updates and Parental Controls

The Wii is capable of downloading updates to its core operating software. These updates may include additional features, patches/fixes, or support for newly released channels. When an update becomes available, Nintendo notifies users by sending a message to their console. Updates are included with certain Wii games, both requiring one to be fully updated in order to play and providing the update should one lack the necessary internet connection.

The Wii Menu also featured Parental Controls to restrict access to certain operations.

See also
 Wii system software
 Xbox 360 Dashboard/New Xbox Experience (NXE)
 XrossMediaBar

References

External links
 Wii Menu from Nintendo.com
 Introducing Wii Menu from Wii.com

Menu
Graphical user interface elements
Video games scored by Kazumi Totaka